Kuthampully Saree is a type of Sari traditionally made by weavers from Kuthampully village in Thiruvilwamala Grama Panchayat of Thrissur district of Kerala state in India. The Kuthampully Saree  is distinguished by its Saree borders.

History
In 1972, Kuthampully Handloom Industrial Cooperative Society was registered with 102 members. Kannada people is almost living in kuthampully . Their caste were Devanga Chettiar origin at Bangalore and Mysore. Now it has 814 members with own building in Kuthampully. In September 2011, the Kuthampully Saree got exclusive Intellectual Property rights through Geographical indication Act (GI).

References

Saris
Economy of Thrissur
Culture of Thrissur district
Indian brands
Geographical indications in Kerala